Chiswick House School forms part of a co-educational establishment in Malta, catering for children between two and eighteen years.

Chiswick is also proposing to build a new school on virgin land in Pembroke, Malta.

See also

 Education in Malta
 List of schools in Malta

References

External links
 , the official website of Chiswick House School and St Martin's College

Msida
San Ġwann
Schools in Malta